Sir George Horsey (c.1588 – buried 10 January 1645) of Clifton Maybank, Dorset was an English landowner engaged in ambitious industrial and land reclamation schemes.

He was the 2nd son of Sir Ralph Horsey and Edith Mohun of Clifton Maybank and was educated at Sherborne School and Trinity College, Oxford. In 1612, after his father's death, he inherited the family estates, which lay in Somerset and Dorset.

He married Elizabeth Freke who predeceased him in 1638. They had four sons including one who died fighting for Parliament in the English Civil War.

He was a Member (MP) of the Parliament of England for Dorchester in 1614, for Poole in 1621 and for Dorset in 1624. He was knighted in 1619.

He invested in a scheme with Dud Dudley to smelt iron using coal, and this as well as other decisions led to the end of the family estate. In 1638, he was imprisoned in Newgate. In 1640, he was again imprisoned, for debt in Dorchester. He probably died in Fleet Prison, having lost his family's entire estate and assets.

References

16th-century births
1640 deaths
Members of the Parliament of England for Dorchester
People educated at Sherborne School
Alumni of Trinity College, Oxford
Prisoners and detainees of England and Wales
English people who died in prison custody
English landowners
English MPs 1614
English MPs 1621–1622
English MPs 1624–1625